A blizzard is a severe winter storm condition characterized by low temperatures, strong winds, and heavy snow.

Blizzard or The Blizzard may also refer to:

Places
 Blizzard Peak, Ross Dependency, Antarctica
 Blizzard Heights, near Blizzard Peak

Arts and entertainment

Fictional characters
 Blizzard (Marvel Comics), primarily foes of Iron Man
 Minister Blizzard, a DC Comics villain, commonly a recurring foe of Wonder Woman
 Blizzard (G.I. Joe)
 Blizzard, from the crime film The Penalty
 Hellish Blizzard, a character from the manga series One-Punch Man

Films
 Blizzard (1944 film), a Swedish drama film
 Blizzard (2003 film), directed by LeVar Burton
 The Blizzard (1921 film), starring Oliver Hardy
 The Blizzard (1923 film), a Swedish drama based on the Selma Lagerlof novel
 The Blizzard (1964 film), a Soviet film based on the short story by Pushkin

Music
 The Blizzards, a rock band from Ireland
 Blizzard (EP), a 2013 EP by Fauve
 Blizzards (album), a 2020 album by Nathan Fake
 "The Blizzard" (song), a song by Jim Reeves
 "The Blizzard", a song by Camera Obscura

Other arts and entertainment
 "The Blizzard", a 1831 short story by Aleksandr Pushkin
 "The Blizzard", a 1985 episode of the sitcom Night Court
 "The Blizzard", a 1999 episode of the children's animated series Arthur

In business 
 Blizzard Entertainment, a video game subsidiary of Activision Blizzard, Inc.
 Blizzard Ski, an Austrian ski manufacturer
 Blizzard Sport, an Austrian sports equipment company
 Dairy Queen Blizzard, an ice cream product

Sports teams

Canada 
 Barrie Blizzard, a lacrosse team based in Barrie, Ontario
 Edmundston Blizzard, a junior ice hockey team from Edmundston, New Brunswick
 Manitoba Blizzard, a box lacrosse team based in Winnipeg, Manitoba
 OCN Blizzard, a junior ice hockey team from The Pas, Manitoba
 The Blizzard, original name of the Sorel-Tracy Éperviers, a hockey team based in Sorel-Tracy, Quebec
 Toronto Blizzard (1971–1984), a defunct soccer organization
 Toronto Blizzard (1986–1993), a defunct soccer organization

United States 
 Alexandria Blizzard, a junior ice hockey team based in Alexandria, Minnesota
 Buffalo Blizzard, a soccer club that existed from 1992 to 2001 in Buffalo, New York
 Colorado Springs Blizzard, an American soccer team
 New England Blizzard (1996–1998), a defunct professional women's basketball organization
 Taos Blizzard, a defunct baseball team based in Taos, New Mexico
 Utica Blizzard, an ice hockey team based in Utica, New York

Other uses
 Buran (spacecraft), a Soviet space shuttle
 Blizzard (surname), a surname
 Blizzard PPC, a PowerUP accelerator PowerPC-based upgrade card for the Amiga
 Blizzard! The Storm That Changed America, a children's history book by Jim Murphy
 The Blizzard (magazine), a British football magazine
 Toyota Blizzard, a four-wheel-drive vehicle manufactured from 1980 into the 1990s

See also 

 Toronto Blizzard (disambiguation)
 Cuby & the Blizzards, a Dutch blues group
 Nor'easter
 Thundersnow
 Big Snow (disambiguation)
 Snowstorm (disambiguation)
 Winter storm (disambiguation)